John "Jock" Skinner Stewart (23 April 1902 – 5 February 1973) was a New Zealand politician of the Labour Party.

Biography

Early life and career
Stewart was born in Greenock, Scotland and served in the British Army during World War I. He then emigrated to New Zealand when he was 24. He later gained employment with the Auckland Transport Board as a clerk.

During World War II he joined the military and was given a staff job as his medical grading prevented him from going abroad. At the end of 1942 he was released from service.

Political career
In 1935 he was elected to the Auckland City Council on a Labour Party ticket where he was chairman of the Library Committee. In both 1933 and 1938 Stewart was defeated standing for the City Council. He was also a member of the Auckland and Suburban Drainage Board. In both the 1950 and 1956 local elections as well as a 1957 by-election he was the Labour Party's candidate for the Auckland mayoralty, placing second, third and second respectively. He initially intended to stand a mayoral candidate in 1953 as well. He was selected as Labour's nominee but later withdrew his candidacy.

Stewart was present as a delegate at the 1940 Labour Party Annual Conference. Whilst in attendance Stewart seconded  MP Bill Schramm's successful motion to expel John A. Lee from the party. Later that year he stood for the Labour nomination at the Auckland West by-election following the death of Prime Minister Michael Joseph Savage, but lost to Peter Carr. Stewart then became chair of the Tamaki electorate committee and later Vice-President of the Auckland Labour Representation Committee.

Member of Parliament

He then contested  in  unsuccessfully.

In parliament Stewart became an agitator against the leadership of Walter Nash and successfully moved the motion in caucus to have a leadership election in mid-1954. Despite Stewart's efforts to replace Nash with Arnold Nordmeyer Nash was re-elected. Stewart was first on election night, with a provisional lead of 172, but after the 1,300 postal votes were counted he lost by a mere 8 votes to National's Duncan Rae. At the 1956 Labour Party annual conference he challenged Mick Moohan for the party presidency, but was defeated in the delegate ballot. At the 1957 conference he again challenged Moohan, but was again unsuccessful.

Later life and death
After leaving parliament he returned to work as a clerk at the Auckland City Council until he retired in 1966.

He died on 5 February 1973. He was survived by his wife and two sons.

Notes

References

1902 births
1973 deaths
New Zealand Labour Party MPs
Members of the New Zealand House of Representatives
New Zealand MPs for Auckland electorates
Auckland City Councillors
People from Greenock
British emigrants to New Zealand
British Army personnel of World War I
New Zealand military personnel of World War II
20th-century New Zealand politicians
Candidates in the 1941 New Zealand general election
Unsuccessful candidates in the 1943 New Zealand general election
Unsuccessful candidates in the 1946 New Zealand general election
Unsuccessful candidates in the 1954 New Zealand general election